Užkapiai ('place beyond graves', formerly) is a village in Kėdainiai district municipality, in Kaunas County, in central Lithuania. According to the 2011 census, the village had a population of 99 people. The Lankesa Botanical Sanctuary is located next to Užkapiai.

In the end of the 19th century Užkapiai was an estate, a property of the Virbickai and the Narkevičiai families.

Demography

References

Villages in Kaunas County
Kėdainiai District Municipality